Simón Corral (Quito, January 5, 1946) is an Ecuadorian poet and dramatist.

He studied sociology at the Central University of Ecuador, and was the president of the Federation of University Students of Ecuador. He was later a professor at the Central University of Ecuador.

He took part in the Tsantzismo movement of the 1960s, Ecuador.

Works
 El cuento de don Mateo (1966; Don Mateo's Story)
 El ejercito de Runas (1970; The Runas' Army)

References 

1946 births
Ecuadorian poets
Ecuadorian dramatists and playwrights
People from Quito
Central University of Ecuador alumni
Living people